James Thomas Lacy (January 8, 1857 – June 18, 1939) was an American Democratic politician who represented Halifax County in the Virginia Senate and Virginia House of Delegates. After being elected to the state senate in 1915, he resigned in March 1919 to become clerk of the Halifax County circuit court.

References

External links

1857 births
1939 deaths
Democratic Party Virginia state senators
People from Halifax, Virginia
20th-century American politicians